The Sutherland Harris Memorial Hospital is a restorative care, veterans and various outpatient and community-based services hospital in Pictou, Nova Scotia. It opened on June 1, 1966. It serves approximately 48,000 people in Pictou County, Nova Scotia. It located at 222 Haliburton Road and is operated by Pictou County Health Authority. The hospital currently has 32 beds.

References

External links
Pictou Health Authority
Aberdeen Hospital

Hospital buildings completed in 1966
Hospitals in Pictou County
Hospitals established in 1966